Schedler is a surname. Notable people with the surname include:

 Hans Schedler (1904–?), German wrestler
 Norbert Schedler (1933–2019), American professor
 Tom Schedler (born 1950), a Secretary of State of Louisiana

Occupational surnames